Richard Rowles (born 3 January 1973) is a former light middleweight boxer, who represented Australia at two consecutive Summer Olympics, starting in 1996 and 2000 Summer Olympics. He won a bronze medal at the 1994 Commonwealth Games in Victoria, British Columbia, Canada.

Born in Lae, in Papua New Guinea, Rowles later on moved to Brisbane, where he was based at Brisbane's Lang Park Amateur Boxing Club, alongside Lang Park.

He was an Australian Institute of Sport scholarship holder.

References

 ABC Profile

External links
 
 
 
 

1973 births
Living people
People from Morobe Province
Australian male boxers
Australian Institute of Sport boxers
Light-middleweight boxers
Olympic boxers of Australia
Boxers at the 1996 Summer Olympics
Boxers at the 2000 Summer Olympics
Commonwealth Games bronze medallists for Australia
Commonwealth Games medallists in boxing
Boxers at the 1994 Commonwealth Games
Medallists at the 1994 Commonwealth Games